Mir Mohammad Arif Mohammad Hassani  is a Pakistani politician who is the current Provincial Minister of the Balochistan for Communication and works, in office since 30 August 2018. He has been a member of Provincial Assembly of the Balochistan since August 2018.

Political career
He was elected to the Provincial Assembly of the Balochistan as an independent candidate from Constituency PB - 34 (Chagai) in 2018 Pakistani General Election.

On 27 August 2018, he was inducted into the provincial Balochistan cabinet of Chief Minister of Jam Kamal Khan. On 30 August, he was appointed as Provincial Minister of Balochistan for Finance.

References

Living people
Politicians from Balochistan, Pakistan
Year of birth missing (living people)